"Have I Got Some Blues for You" is a song recorded by American country music artist Charley Pride.  It was released in March 1987 as the first single from the album After All This Time.  The song reached #14 on the Billboard Hot Country Singles & Tracks chart.  The song was written by David Chamberlain.

Chart performance

References

1987 singles
1987 songs
Charley Pride songs
16th Avenue Records singles
Songs written by David Chamberlain (songwriter)